The city of Providence, Rhode Island has 25 official neighborhoods.

 Blackstone
 Charles
 College Hill
 Downtown
 Elmhurst
 Elmwood
 Federal Hill
 Fox Point
 Hartford
 Hope (Summit)
 Lower South Providence
 Manton
 Mount Hope
 Mount Pleasant
 Olneyville
 Reservoir
 Silver Lake
 Smith Hill
 South Elmwood
 Upper South Providence
 Valley
 Wanskuck
 Washington Park
 Wayland
 West End

Regions 
Many of these neighborhoods are often grouped together referred to collectively:

 East Side – Blackstone, Hope, Mount Hope, College Hill, Wayland, and Fox Point.
 North End – Charles, Wanskuck, Smith Hill, Elmhurst, and Mount Pleasant.
 South Side or South Providence – Elmwood, Lower South Providence, Upper South Providence, West End, and Washington Park.

The Jewelry District occupies the southern portion of Downtown Providence. Since the area was re-united with Downtown following the relocation of Interstate 195, the city has been working to attract high-tech and research companies to this area under the rebranded name of "Knowledge District." This area is not recognized as one of Providence's 25 official neighborhoods. The Hospital District, a non-residential area within Upper South Providence is similarly unrecognized.

The oldest, highest density neighborhoods are either those close to Downtown or proximate to the Woonasquatucket River, which provided a power source for early industrialization in Manton, Hartford, and Olneyville. More distant neighborhoods developed later, mostly as transportation as public horse car and streetcar lines were added.

References

 
Neighborhoods
Providence